"The Music Goes 'Round My Head" is a 1967 song and single by Australian rock group The Easybeats, which was written by band members George Young and Harry Vanda.

Background and releases
On returning from their U.S. tour, The Easybeats began work on the group's next single at Pye Studios in London. The song was influenced by the Jamaican ska music that was currently popular among London's mod scene.  Much in the same way The Beatles song "Ob-La-Di, Ob-La-Da" would be the following year.

The single was released in the U.K., Australia, Brazil and New Zealand.  Various versions of the song have been released.  In Spain, a faster version released as the B-side to the "Hello, How Are You" single.

Although it received positive reviews from the U.K. music press, it failed to make an impact commercially.

Track listing
Australia - Parlophone 	A-8277
U.K. - United Artists UP 1201
"The Music Goes Round My Head" (Harry Vanda, George Young)
"Come In You'll Get Pneumonia" (Harry Vanda, George Young)

Personnel

Musicians
Dick Diamonde – bass guitar
Tony Cahill – drums
Harry Vanda – lead guitar
Stevie Wright – lead vocals
George Young – rhythm guitar

Technical
Harry Vanda – producer
George Young – producer
Mike Vaughan – producer

The Saints version

The Saints covered the song for their 1988 album, Prodigal Son, which reached the Top 50. The line-up was Chris Bailey, Barry Francis, Arturo Larizza, Iain Shedden and Joe Chiofalo on organ. It was produced by Bailey, Brian McGee and Vanda & Young. A single of the cover was released in February 1989, it was an Australian Top 40 and reached No. 19 on the US Alternative Songs chart.  It also featured in on the soundtrack of the 1988 film, Young Einstein

Personnel
Musicians
Arturo LaRizza – bass guitar
Iain Shedden – drums
Barry Francis – guitar
Chris Bailey – lead vocals
Joe Chiofalo – organ

Technical
Harry Vanda – producer
George Young – producer
Chris Bailey – producer
Brian McGee – producer

Charts

References

1967 singles
The Easybeats songs
Parlophone singles
Songs written by George Young (rock musician)
1967 songs
Songs written by Harry Vanda
1989 singles
Mushroom Records singles